Leonhard Waitl (5 April 1939 – 7 March 2010) was a German ice hockey player. He competed in the men's tournaments at the 1960 Winter Olympics, the 1964 Winter Olympics and the 1968 Winter Olympics.

References

External links
 

1939 births
2010 deaths
German ice hockey players
Ice hockey players at the 1960 Winter Olympics
Ice hockey players at the 1964 Winter Olympics
Ice hockey players at the 1968 Winter Olympics
Olympic ice hockey players of Germany
Olympic ice hockey players of the United Team of Germany
Olympic ice hockey players of West Germany
Sportspeople from Füssen